The Status Athens Open was a professional tennis tournament played on outdoor hard courts. It was currently part of the Association of Tennis Professionals (ATP) Challenger Tour. It was held annually in Athens, Greece, and has been since 2008.

Lu Yen-hsun was the only player to win both singles and doubles title in the same year.

Past finals

Singles

Doubles

External links
Official site
ITF search

 
ATP Challenger Tour
Hard court tennis tournaments
Annual sports competitions in Athens
Tennis tournaments in Greece